GLX may refer to:
 GLX, OpenGL Extension to the X Window System
 Gamar Malamo Airport, in Indonesia
 GLX, the Global LNG Exchange, a liquefied natural gas trading platform
 Green Line Extension, a light rail project in Cambridge, Somerville, and Medford, Massachusetts, United States